The Republic of Serbian Krajina or Serb Republic of Krajina ( /  or РСК / RSK), known as the Serbian Krajina ( / ) or simply Krajina, was a self-proclaimed Serb proto-state, a territory within the newly independent Republic of Croatia (formerly part of Socialist Yugoslavia), which it defied, and which was active during the Croatian War of Independence (1991–95). It was not recognized internationally. The name Krajina ("Frontier") was adopted from the historical Military Frontier of the Habsburg monarchy (Austria-Hungary), which had a substantial Serb population and existed up to the late 19th century. The RSK government waged a war for ethnic Serb independence from Croatia and unification with the Federal Republic of Yugoslavia and Republika Srpska (in Bosnia and Herzegovina).

The government of Krajina had de facto control over central parts of the territory while control of the outskirts changed with the successes and failures of its military activities. The territory was legally protected by the United Nations Protection Force (UNPROFOR).

Its main portion was overrun by Croatian forces in 1995 and the Republic of Serbian Krajina was ultimately disbanded as a result; a rump remained in eastern Slavonia under UNTAES administration until its peaceful reintegration into Croatia in 1998 under the Erdut Agreement.

Background
The name Krajina (meaning "frontier") stemmed from the Military Frontier which the Habsburg monarchy carved out of parts of the crown lands of Croatia and Slavonia between 1553 and 1578 with a view to defending itself against the expansion of the Ottoman Empire. The population was Mainly Croats, Serbs and Vlachs who immigrated from nearby parts of the Ottoman Empire (Ottoman Bosnia and Serbia) into the region and helped bolster and replenish the population as well as the garrisoned troops in the fight against the Ottomans. The Austrians controlled the Frontier from military headquarters in Vienna and did not make it a crown land, though it had some special rights in order to encourage settlement in an otherwise deserted, war-ravaged territory. The abolition of the military rule took place between 1869 and 1871. In order to attract Serbs to become part of Croatia, on 11 May 1867, the Sabor solemnly declared that "the Triune Kingdom recognizes the Serbs living in it as a nation identical and equal with the Croatian nation". Subsequently, the Military Frontier was incorporated into Habsburg Croatia on 1 August 1881 when the Ban of Croatia Ladislav Pejačević took over from the Zagreb General Command.

Following the end of World War I in 1918, the regions formerly forming part of the Military Frontier came under the control of the Kingdom of Yugoslavia, where they formed part of the Sava Banovina, along with most of the old Croatia-Slavonia. Between the two World Wars, the Serbs of the Croatian and Slavonian Krajina, as well as those of the Bosnian Krajina and of other regions west of Serbia, organized a notable political party, the Independent Democratic Party under Svetozar Pribićević. In the new state there existed much tension between the Croats and Serbs over differing political visions, with the campaign for Croatian autonomy culminating in the assassination of a Croatian leader, Stjepan Radić, in the parliament, and repression by the Serb-dominated security structures.

Between 1939 and 1941, in an attempt to resolve the Croat-Serb political and social antagonism in first Yugoslavia, the Kingdom established an autonomous Banovina of Croatia incorporating (amongst other territories) much of the former Military Frontier as well as parts of Bosnia and Herzegovina. In 1941, the Axis powers invaded Yugoslavia and in the aftermath the Independent State of Croatia (which included the whole of today's Bosnia and Herzegovina and parts of Serbia (Eastern Syrmia) as well) was declared. The Germans installed the Ustaše (who had allegedly plotted the assassination of the Serbian King Alexander I of Yugoslavia in 1934) as rulers of the new country; the Ustaše authorities promptly pursued a genocidal policy of persecution of Serbs, Jews and Croats (from opposition groups), leading to the deaths of over 300,000. During this period, individual Croats coalesced around the ruling authorities or around the communist anti-fascist Partisans. Serbs from around the Knin area tended to join the Chetniks, whilst Serbs from the Banovina and Slavonia regions tended to join the Partisans. Various Chetnik groups also committed atrocities against Croats across many areas of Lika and parts of northern Dalmatia.

At the end of World War II in 1945, the communist-dominated Partisans prevailed and the Krajina region became part of the People's Republic of Croatia until 7 April 1963, when the federal republic changed its name to the Socialist Republic of Croatia. Josip Broz Tito suppressed the autonomous political organizations of the region (along with other movements such as the Croatian Spring); however, the Yugoslav constitutions of 1965 and 1974 did give substantial rights to national minorities - including to the Serbs in SR Croatia.

The Serbian "Krajina" entity to emerge upon Croatia's declaration of independence in 1991 would include three kinds of territories:

 a large section of the historical Military Frontier, in areas with a majority Serbian population;
 areas such as parts of northern Dalmatia, that never formed part of the Frontier but had a majority or a plurality of Serbian population, including the self-proclaimed entity's capital, Knin;
 areas that bordered with Serbia and where Serbs formed a significant minority (Baranya, Vukovar).

Large sections of the historical Military Frontier lay outside of the Republic of Serbian Krajina and contained a largely Croat population - these including much of Lika, the area centered around the city of Bjelovar, central and south-eastern Slavonia.

Creation

 
 
 
The Serb-populated regions in Croatia were of central concern to the Serbian nationalist movement of the late 1980s, led by Slobodan Milošević. In September 1986 the Serbian Academy's memorandum on the status of Serbia and Serbs was partially leaked by a Serbian newspaper. It listed a series of grievances against the Yugoslav federation, claiming that the situation in Kosovo was 'genocide', and complained about alleged discrimination of Serbs at the hands of the Croatian authorities. Among the claims that it makes is that 'except for the time under the Independent State of Croatia, the Serbs in Croatia have never been as jeopardized as they are today'. Tension was further fuelled by the overthrow of Vojvodina and Montenegro's government by Milošević's loyalists, and the abrogation of Kosovo's and Vojvodina's autonomy in 1989, which gave Milošević 4 out of 8 votes on the Yugoslav Federal Presidency, thus gaining the power to block every decision made by the Presidency. Furthermore, a series of Serb nationalist rallies were held in Croatia during 1989, under pressure from Serbia. On 8 July 1989, a large nationalist rally was held in Knin, during which banners threatening JNA intervention in Croatia, as well as Chetnik iconography was displayed, stunning the Croatian public. The Croatian pro-independence party victory in 1990 made matters more tense, especially since the country's Serb minority was supported by Milošević. At the time, Serbs comprised about 12.2% (581,663 people) of Croatia's population (1991 census).

Serbs became increasingly opposed to the policies of Franjo Tuđman, elected president of Croatia in April 1990, due to his overt desire for the creation of an independent Croatia.  On 30 May 1990, the Serb Democratic Party (SDS) of Jovan Rašković broke all ties to the Croatian parliament. The following June in Knin, the SDS-led Serbs proclaimed the creation of the Association of Municipalities of Northern Dalmatia and Lika.  In August 1990, the Serbs began what became known as the Log Revolution, where barricades of logs were placed across roads throughout the South as an expression of their secession from Croatia.  This effectively cut Croatia in two, separating the coastal region of Dalmatia from the rest of the country. The Constitution of Croatia was passed in December 1990, which reduced the status of Serbs from "constituent" to a "national minority" in the same category as other groups such as Italians and Hungarians. Some would later justify their claim to an independent Serb state by arguing that the new constitution contradicted the 1974 Yugoslav Constitution, because, in their view, Croatia was still legally governed by the Socialist Federal Republic of Yugoslavia, although this ignores the fact that Serbia's constitution, promulgated three months before Croatia's, also contained several provisions violating the 1974 Federal Constitution.

Serbs in Croatia had established a Serbian National Council in July 1990 to coordinate opposition to Croatian independence.  Their position was that if Croatia could secede from Yugoslavia, then the Serbs could secede from Croatia. Milan Babić, a dentist by profession from the southern town of Knin, was elected president. At his ICTY trial in 2004, he claimed that "during the events [of 1990–1992], and in particular at the beginning of his political career, he was strongly influenced and misled by Serbian propaganda, which repeatedly referred to the imminent threat of a Croatian genocide perpetrated on the Serbs in Croatia, thus creating an atmosphere of hatred and fear of Croats." The rebel Croatian Serbs established a number of paramilitary militia units under the leadership of Milan Martić, the police chief in Knin.

In August 1990, a referendum was held in Krajina on the question of Serb "sovereignty and autonomy" in Croatia. The resolution was confined exclusively to Serbs so it passed by an improbable majority of 99.7%. As expected, it was declared illegal and invalid by the Croatian government, who stated that Serbs had no constitutional right to break away from Croatian legal territory - as well as no right to limit the franchise to one ethnic group.

Babić's administration announced the creation of a Serbian Autonomous Oblast of Krajina (or SAO Krajina) on 21 December 1990. On 16 March 1991, another referendum was held which asked: "Are you in favor of the SAO Krajina joining the Republic of Serbia and staying in Yugoslavia with Serbia, Montenegro and others who wish to preserve Yugoslavia?". With 99.8% voting in favor, the referendum was approved and the Krajina assembly declared that "the territory of the SAO Krajina is a constitutive part of the unified state territory of the Republic of Serbia". On 1 April 1991, it declared that it would secede from Croatia. Other Serb-dominated communities in eastern Croatia announced that they would also join SAO Krajina and ceased paying taxes to the Zagreb government, and began implementing its own currency system, army regiments, and postal service.

Croatia held a referendum on independence on 19 May 1991, in which the electorate—minus many Serbs, who chose to boycott it—voted overwhelmingly for independence with the option of confederate union with other Yugoslav states - with 83 percent turnout, voters approved the referendum by 93 percent.  On 25 June 1991, Croatia and Slovenia both declared their independence from Yugoslavia. As the JNA attempted unsuccessfully to suppress Slovenia's independence in the short Slovenian War, clashes between revolting Croatian Serbs and Croatian security forces broke out almost immediately, leaving dozens dead on both sides. Serbs were supported by remnants of the JNA (whose members were now only from Serbia and Montenegro), which provided them weapons. Many Croatians fled their homes in fear or were forced out by the rebel Serbs. The European Union and United Nations unsuccessfully attempted to broker ceasefires and peace settlements.
 
Around August 1991, the leaders of Serbian Krajina and Serbia allegedly agreed to embark on a campaign which the ICTY prosecutors described as a "joint criminal enterprise" whose purpose "was the forcible removal of the majority of the Croat and other non-Serb population from approximately one-third of the territory of the Republic of Croatia, an area he planned to become part of a new Serb-dominated state." According to testimony given by Milan Babić in his subsequent war crimes trial, during the summer of 1991, the Serbian secret police (under Milošević's command) set up "a parallel structure of state security and the police of Krajina and units commanded by the state security of Serbia". Paramilitary groups such as the Wolves of Vučjak and White Eagles, funded by the Serbian secret police, were also a key component of this structure.

A wider-scale war was launched in August 1991. Over the following months, a large area of territory, amounting to a third of Croatia, was controlled by the rebel Serbs. The Croatian population suffered heavily, fleeing or evicted with numerous killings, leading to ethnic cleansing. The bulk of the fighting occurred between August and December 1991 when approximately 80,000 Croats were expelled (and some were killed). Many more died and or were displaced in fighting in eastern Slavonia (this territory along the Croatian/Serbian border was not part of the Krajina, and it was the JNA that was the principal actor in that part of the conflict). The total number of exiled Croats and other non-Serbs range from 170,000 (ICTY) up to a quarter of a million people (Human Rights Watch).

In the latter half of 1991, Croatia was beginning to form an army and their main defenders, the local police, were overpowered by the JNA military who supported rebelled Croatian Serbs. The RSK was located entirely inland, but they soon started advancing deeper into Croatian territory. Among other places, they shelled the Croatian coastal town of Zadar killing over 80 people in nearby areas and damaging the Maslenica Bridge that connected northern and southern Croatia, in the Operation Coast-91. They also tried to overtake Šibenik, but the defenders successfully repelled the attack by JNA, in the Battle of Šibenik. The main city theatre was also bombed by JNA forces. The city of Vukovar, however, was completely devastated by JNA attacks. The city of Vukovar that warded off JNA attacks for months eventually fell, ending the Battle of Vukovar. 2,000 defenders of Vukovar and civilians were killed, 800 went missing and 22,000 were forced into exile. The wounded were taken from Vukovar Hospital to Ovčara near Vukovar where they were executed.

Formal proclamations
On 19 December 1991, the SAO Krajina proclaimed itself the Republic of Serbian Krajina. The Constitution of Serbian Krajina came into effect the same day. On 26 February 1992, the SAO Western Slavonia and SAO Slavonia, Baranja and Western Syrmia were added to the RSK, which initially had only encompassed the territories within the SAO Krajina. The Army of the Republic of Serb Krajina (Srpska Vojska Krajine, SVK) was officially formed on 19 March 1992. The RSK occupied an area of some 17,028 km2 at its greatest extent.

1992 ceasefire

Under the Vance plan, signed in November 1991, Presidents Tuđman and Milošević agreed to a United Nations peace plan put forward by Cyrus Vance.
A final ceasefire agreement, the Sarajevo Agreement, was signed by representatives of the two sides in January 1992, paving the way for the implementation of the Vance plan. Four United Nations Protected Areas (UNPAs) were established in Croatian territory which was claimed by RSK, and the plan called for the withdrawal of the JNA from Croatia and for the return of refugees to their homes in the UNPAs.

The JNA officially withdrew from Croatia in May 1992 but much of its weaponry and many of its personnel remained in the Serb-held areas and were turned over to the RSK's security forces. Refugees were not allowed to return to their homes and many of the remaining Croats and other nationalities left in the RSK were expelled or killed in the following months. On 21 February 1992, the creation of the United Nations Protection Force (UNPROFOR) was authorised by the UN Security Council for an initial period of a year, to provide security to the UNPAs.

The agreement effectively froze the front lines for the next three years. Croatia and the RSK had effectively fought each other to a standstill. The Republic of Serbian Krajina was not recognized de jure by any other country or international organization. Nevertheless, it gained support from Serbia's allies, like Russia.

After the ceasefire
UNPROFOR was deployed throughout the region to maintain the ceasefire, although in practice its light armament and restricted rules of engagement meant that it was little more than an observer force. It proved wholly unable to ensure that refugees returned to the RSK. Indeed, the rebel Croatian Serb authorities continued to make efforts to ensure that they could never return, destroying villages and cultural and religious monuments to erase the previous existence of the Croatian inhabitants of the Krajina. Milan Babić later testified that this policy was driven from Belgrade through the Serbian secret police—and ultimately Milošević—who he claimed was in control of all the administrative institutions and armed forces in the Krajina. This would certainly explain why the Yugoslav National Army took the side of the rebelled Croatian Serbs in spite of its claims to be acting as a "peacekeeping" force. Milošević denied this, claiming that Babić had made it up "out of fear".

The Army of Serbian Krajina frequently attacked neighboring Bihać enclave (then in the Republic of Bosnia and Herzegovina) with heavy artillery.

With the creation of new Croatian counties on 30 December 1992, the Croatian government also set aside two autonomous regions (kotar) for ethnic Serbs in the areas of Krajina:
 Autonomous District of Glina
 Municipalities de jure within the Autonomous District of Glina were Glina, Vrginmost, Hrvatska Kostajnica, Dvor and Vojnić.
 Autonomous District of Knin

However, Serbs considered this too late, as it was not the amount of autonomy they wanted, and by now they had declared de facto independence.

The districts never actually functioned since they were located within the self-proclaimed Republic of Serbian Krajina. The existence of the Autonomous District of Glina was also provided in the draft of the Z-4 plan, that was rejected.
After Operation Storm, the application of the law which allowed autonomy would be temporarily suspended. In 2000 this part of the law was formally repealed.

Decline

The partial implementation of the Vance Plan drove a wedge between the governments of the RSK and Serbia, the RSK's principal backer and supplier of fuel, arms, and money. Milan Babić strongly opposed the Vance Plan but was overruled by the RSK's assembly.

On 26 February 1992, Babić was deposed and replaced as President of the RSK by Goran Hadžić, a Milošević loyalist. Babić remained involved in RSK politics but as a considerably weaker figure.

The position of the RSK eroded steadily over the following three years. On the surface, the RSK had all the trappings of a state: army, parliament, president, government and ministries, currency and stamps. However, its economy was wholly dependent on support from the rump Yugoslavia, which had the effect of importing that country's hyperinflation.

The economic situation soon became disastrous. By 1994, only 36,000 of the RSK's 430,000 citizens were employed. The war had severed the RSK's trade links with the rest of Croatia, leaving its few industries idle. With few natural resources of its own, it had to import most of the goods and fuel it required. Agriculture was devastated, and operated at little more than a subsistence level. Professionals went to Serbia or elsewhere to escape the republic's economic hardships. To make matters worse, the RSK's government was grossly corrupt and the region became a haven for black marketeering and other criminal activity. It was clear by the mid-1990s that without a peace deal or support from Yugoslavia the RSK was not economically viable. This was especially evident in Belgrade, where the RSK had become an unwanted economic and political burden for Milošević. Much to his frustration, the rebel Croatian Serbs rebuffed his government's demands to settle the conflict. 
In July 1992 the RSK issued its own currency, the Krajina dinar (HRKR), in parallel with the Yugoslav dinar. This was followed by the "October dinar" (HRKO), first issued on 1 October 1993 and equal to 1,000,000 Reformed Dinar, and the "1994 dinar", first issued on 1 January 1994, and equal to 1,000,000,000 October dinar.
The RSK's weakness also adversely affected its armed forces, the Vojska Srpske Krajine (VSK). Since the 1992 ceasefire agreement, Croatia had spent heavily on importing weapons and training its armed forces with assistance from American contractors. In contrast, the VSK had grown steadily weaker, with its soldiers poorly motivated, trained and equipped. There were only about 55,000 of them to cover a front of some 600 km in Croatia plus 100 km along the border with the Bihać pocket in Bosnia. With 16,000 stationed in eastern Slavonia, only about 39,000 were left to defend the main part of the RSK. Overall, only 30,000 were capable of full mobilization, yet they faced a far stronger Croatian army. Also, political divisions between Hadžić and Babić occasionally led to physical and sometimes even armed confrontations between their supporters; Babić himself was assaulted and beaten in an incident in Benkovac.

In January 1993 the revitalized Croatian army attacked the Serbian positions around Maslenica in southern Croatia which curtailed their access to the sea via Novigrad.

In mid-1993, the RSK authorities started a campaign to formally create a United Serbian Republic.

In a second offensive in mid-September 1993, the Croatian army overran the Medak pocket in southern Krajina in a push to regain Serb-held Croatian territory. The rebel Croatian Serbs brought reinforcements forward fairly quickly, but the strength of the Croatian forces proved superior. The Croatian offensive was halted by a combination of a battalion of Canadian peacekeepers from the second battalion of Princess Patricia's Canadian Light Infantry (PPCLI) reinforced by a Company of French peacekeepers, combined with international diplomacy. Hadžić sent an urgent request to Belgrade for reinforcements, arms, and equipment. In response, around 4,000 paramilitaries under the command of Vojislav Šešelj (the White Eagles) and "Arkan" (the Serb Volunteer Guard) arrived to bolster the VSK.

Operation Flash and Storm 

Following the rejection by both sides of the Z-4 plan for reintegration, the RSK's end came in 1995, when Croatian forces gained control of SAO Western Slavonia in Operation Flash (May) followed by the biggest part of occupied Croatia in Operation Storm (August). The Krajina Serb Supreme Defence Council met under president Milan Martić to discuss the situation. A decision was reached at 16:45 to "start evacuating the population unfit for military service from the municipalities of Knin, Benkovac, Obrovac, Drniš and Gračac." The RSK was disbanded and most of its Serb population (from 150,000 to 200,000 people) fled. Only 5,000 to 6,000 people remained, mostly the elderly. Croatian historian Ivo Goldstein wrote, "The reasons for the Serb exodus are complex. Some had to leave because the Serb army had forced them to, while others feared the revenge of the Croatian army or of their former Croat neighbors, whom they had driven away and whose homes they had mostly looted (and it was later shown that this fear was far from groundless)".
Most of the refugees fled to today's Serbia, Bosnia, and eastern Slavonia. Some of those who refused to leave were murdered, tortured and forcibly expelled by the Croatian Army and police.

Between 2001 and 2012, the ICTY had prosecuted Croatian generals Ante Gotovina, Mladen Markač and Ivan Čermak in the Trial of Gotovina et al for their involvement in crimes committed during and in the aftermath of Operation Storm. The indictment and the subsequent trial on charges of crimes against humanity and violations of the laws or customs of war described several killings, widespread arson and looting committed by Croatian soldiers. In April 2011, Gotovina and Markač were convicted and given prison sentences, while Čermak was acquitted. Gotovina and Markač appealed the verdict and in November 2012 the Appeals Chamber of the ICTY overturned their convictions, acquitting them.

Later events

The parts of the former RSK in eastern Croatia (along with the Danube) remained in place, in what was previously the SAO Eastern Slavonia, Baranja and Western Syrmia.

In 1995, Milan Milanović, formerly a Republic of Serbian Krajina official, signed the Erdut Agreement as a representative of the Serbian side. This agreement, co-signed by the representative of the Croatian Government, was sponsored by the United Nations, and it set up a transitional period during which the United Nations Transitional Authority for Eastern Slavonia, Baranja and Western Sirmium (UNTAES) peacekeeping mission would oversee a peaceful reintegration of this territory into Croatia, starting on 15 January 1996. In 1998, the UNTAES mission was complete and the territory was formally returned to Croatia. Based on the Erdut Agreement, the Joint Council of Municipalities was established in the region in 1997.

After the peaceful reintegration, two Croatian islands on the Danube, the Island of Šarengrad and the Island of Vukovar, remained under Serbian military control. In 2004, the Serbian military was withdrawn from the islands and replaced with Serbian police. The islands remain an open question as the Croatian side insists on applying Badinter Arbitration Committee decisions.

In 1995 a Croatian court sentenced former RSK president Goran Hadžić in absentia to 20 years in prison for rocket attacks on Šibenik and Vodice. In 1999 he was sentenced to an additional 20 years for war crimes in Tenja, near Osijek, and in 2002 Croatia's state attorney brought another indictment against him for the murder of almost 1,300 Croats in Vukovar, Osijek, Vinkovci, Županja and elsewhere. On 4 June 2004, the ICTY indicted him on 14 counts of war crimes and crimes against humanity. In 2011 he was arrested and extradited to the Hague, where his initial trial hearing was held on 25 July the same year.

After the war, a number of towns and municipalities that had comprised the RSK were designated Areas of Special State Concern.

Demographics
According to the indictment of prosecutor Carla Del Ponte against Slobodan Milošević at the ICTY, the Croat and non-Serb population from the 1991 census was approximately as follows:

Thus Serbs comprised 52.3% and Croats 35.8% of the population of SAO Krajina respectively in 1991.

According to data set forth at the meeting of the Government of the RSK in July 1992, its ethnic composition was 88% Serbs, 7% Croats, 5% others. As of November 1993, less than 400 ethnic Croats still resided in UNPA Sector South, and between 1,500 and 2,000 remained in UNPA Sector North.

Towns
Towns which were at one point part of RSK or occupied by the RSK's army:

 Beli Manastir
 Benkovac
 Biskupija
 Boričevac
 Borovo
 Cetingrad
 Donji Lapac
 Drniš
 Dubica
 Dvor
 Erdut
 Ervenik
 Glina
 Gračac
 Gvozd
 Jagodnjak
 Jasenovac
 Kistanje
 Knin
 Korenica
 Kostajnica
 Krnjak
 Lovinac
 Majur
 Markušica
 Maslenica
 Negoslavci
 Nunić
 Obrovac
 Okučani
 Petrinja
 Plitvička Jezera
 Plaski
 Rakovica
 Saborsko
 Slunj
 Sveti Rok
 Šodolovci
 Strmica
 Sunja
 Topusko
 Trpinja
 Udbina
 Vojnić
 Vrhovine
 Vrlika
 Vukovar

Status
Serbian Krajina has been described as a "proto-state" and "parastate".

Legal status
 
During its existence, this entity did not achieve international recognition. On 29 November 1991, the Badinter commission concluded that Yugoslavia was "in dissolution" and that the republics – including Croatia – should be recognized as independent states when they asked so. They also assigned these republics territorial integrity. For most of the world, this was a reason to recognize Croatia. However, Serbia did not accept the conclusions of the commission in that period and recognized Croatia only after Croatian military actions (Oluja and Bljesak) and the Dayton agreement.

On 20 November 1991 Lord Carrington asked Badinter commission: "Does the Serbian population in Croatia and Bosnia and Herzegovina, as one of the constituent peoples of Yugoslavia, have the right to self-determination?" The commission concluded on 11 January 1992 "that the Serbian population in Bosnia and Herzegovina and Croatia is entitled to all the rights concerned to minorities and ethnic groups[...]" and "that the Republics must afford the members of those minorities and ethnic groups all the human rights and fundamental freedoms recognized in international law, including, where appropriate, the right to choose their nationality".

Support and funding
Milan Babić, former President of Serbian Krajina, testified to the International Criminal Tribunal for the former Yugoslavia (ICTY) that Krajina was provided with weapons by Slobodan Milošević's government in Serbia, and that Krajina was economically and financially dependent upon Serbia. Babić testified that Milošević held de facto control over both the Army of Serbian Krajina and the Yugoslav People's Army (JNA) during its actions in Krajina via an alternate chain of command through the Serbian police.

Government

Presidents
Milan Babić (19 December 1991 – 16 February 1992)
Mile Paspalj (16 February 1992 – 26 February 1992) (acting)
Goran Hadžić (26 February 1992 – 12 December 1993)
Milan Babić (12 December 1993 – 23 January 1994)
Milan Martić (23 January 1994 – 7 August 1995)

Prime Ministers
Dušan Vještica (19 December 1991 – 16 February 1992)
Risto Matković (16 February 1992 – 26 February 1992) (acting)
Zdravko Zečević (26 February 1992 – 21 April 1993)
Đorđe Bjegović (21 April 1993 – 27 March 1994)
Borislav Mikelić (27 March 1994 – 27 July 1995)
Milan Babić (27 July 1995 – 7 August 1995)

Speaker of the National Assembly
Mile Paspalj

See also
Military of Serbian Krajina
Republika Srpska
Serbs of Croatia

Annotations

References

Sources
Books
 
 
 
 
 
 
 
 
 
 
 

Journals
 
 
 
 
 
 
 

Documents
 
 

Cleanup
 "Operation Storm – Attack on the Krajina", Jane's Intelligence Review, 1 November 1995
  Дакић М. Крајина кроз вијекове: из историjе политичких, националних и људских права српског народа у Хрватскоj. — Београд, 2002.
  Радуловиħ С. Судбина Краjине. — Београд: Дан Граф, 1996. — 189 с.
  Радослав И. Чубрило, Биљана Р. Ивковић, Душан Ђаковић, Јован Адамовић, Милан Ђ. Родић и др. Српска Крајина. — Београд: Матић, 2011. — 742 с.
  Република Српска Краjина: десет година послиjе / [уредник Вељко Ђурић Мишина]. — Београд: Добра Вольа, 2005. — 342 с. — 
  Република Српска Краjина: десет година послиjе. Књ. 2 / [уредник Вељко Ђурић Мишина]. — Београд: Добра Вольа, 2005. — 250 с. — 
  Штрбац, Саво Рат и ријеч. — Бања Лука: Графид, 2011. — 190 с. —

External links

 The Homeland War
 Slobodna Dalmacija Granić kaže da Haag nema dokumente o agresiji na Hrvatsku?
 (English) Resolution adopted by the General Assembly of the United Nations A/RES/49/43 The situation in the occupied territories of Croatia
 Map (from a site run by minister of intelligence of RSK)
 The Thorny Issue of Ethnic Autonomy in Croatia: Serb Leaders and Proposals for Autonomy, Nina Caspersen, London School of Economics and Political Science (http://www.ecmi.de/fileadmin/downloads/publications/JEMIE/2003/nr3/Focus3-2003_Caspersen.pdf)

Notes

 
Serbian Krajina
History of the Serbs of Croatia
1990s in Croatia
Separatism in Croatia
States and territories established in 1991
States and territories disestablished in 1995
1991 establishments in Croatia
1995 disestablishments in Croatia
Serbian Krajina